The 16th London Turkish Film Festival is a film festival held in London, England which ran from November 4 to 18, 2010. During the course of the festival seventeen feature films and two programmes of shorts were presented at the Apollo Theatre and the Rio Cinema.

The festival began with an opening gala at the Empire, Leicester Square, attended by Turkish Ambassador to London Ünal Çeviköz, Turkish Ministry of Culture and Tourism official Abdurrahman Çelik, actor Şener Şen, film and theater star Genco Erkal and director Çağan Irmak, at which the Golden Wings awards for Lifetime Achievement and Digiturk Digital Distribution were presented and Sleeping Princess directed by Çağan Irmak received its world premiere.

Awards 
 Golden Wings Lifetime Achievement Award: Şener Şen (actor)
 Golden Wings Digiturk Digital Distribution Award: Honey directed by Semih Kaplanoğlu

Programmes

Opening Film 
 Sleeping Princess directed by Çağan Irmak

Golden Wings Digiturk Digital Distribution Competition 
Five Turkish films made in the preceding year were selected to compete in the festival’s feature film competition.

Competition Jury 
 Catharine des Forges (Independent Cinema Office director)
 Derek Malcolm (film writer and critic)
 Sevin Okyay (Turkish film critic, writer and translator)
 Louis Savy (Sci-Fi-London festival programmer and director)

Films in Competition 
 Cosmos directed by Reha Erdem
 The Crossing directed by Selim Demirdelen
 Honey directed by Semih Kaplanoğlu
 In Darkness directed by Çağan Irmak
 Majority directed by Seren Yüce

Out of Competition Showings 
 Based Down South directed by Martina Priessner
Black and White directed by Ahmet Boyacıoğlu
 Dark Cloud directed by Theron Patterson
 Loose Cannons directed by Ferzan Özpetek
 Müezzin directed by Sebastian Brameshuber
 Not Worth A Fig directed by Selda Çiçek
 Resurrecting: The Street Walker directed by Özgür Uyanık
 Tales From Kars directed by Özcan Alper, Ülkü Oktay, Emre Akay, Ahu Öztürk & Zehra Derya Koç
 Turquoise directed by Kadir Balcı

 "Yusuf Trilogy" by Semih Kaplanoğlu 
 Egg directed by Semih Kaplanoğlu
 Milk'' directed by Semih Kaplanoğlu

See also 
 2010 in film
 Turkish films of 2010

External links
  for the festival

References

2010 film festivals
2010 festivals in Europe
2010 in London